The 2017 Open Sud de France was a tennis tournament played on indoor hard courts. It was the 30th edition of the Open Sud de France, and part of the ATP World Tour 250 Series of the 2017 ATP World Tour. It took place at the Arena Montpellier in Montpellier, France, from February 6 to February 12, 2017.

Points and prize money

Point distribution

Prize money

Singles main draw entrants

Seeds 

 1 Rankings are as of January 30, 2017.

Other entrants 
The following players received wildcards into the singles main draw:
  Quentin Halys
  Feliciano López
  Alexander Zverev

The following players received entry from the qualifying draw:
  Julien Benneteau
  Calvin Hemery
  Tristan Lamasine
  Kenny de Schepper

The following players received entry as  lucky losers:
  Grégoire Barrère
  Vincent Millot

Withdrawals
Before the tournament
  Dan Evans →replaced by  Grégoire Barrère
  Florian Mayer →replaced by  Aljaž Bedene
  Adam Pavlásek →replaced by  Daniil Medvedev
  Gilles Simon →replaced by  Tobias Kamke
  Jan-Lennard Struff →replaced by  Vincent Millot

Retirements
  Dustin Brown

Doubles main draw entrants

Seeds 

 1 Rankings are as of January 30, 2017.

Other entrants 
The following pair received a wildcard into the doubles main draw:
  Quentin Halys /  Tristan Lamasine

The following pair received entry as alternates:
  Borna Ćorić /  Benoît Paire

Withdrawals 
Before the tournament
  Marcel Granollers
  Karen Khachanov
  Paul-Henri Mathieu
  Leander Paes

Champions

Singles 

  Alexander Zverev def.  Richard Gasquet, 7–6(7–4), 6–3

Doubles 

  Alexander Zverev /  Mischa Zverev def.  Fabrice Martin /  Daniel Nestor, 6–4, 6–7(3–7), [10–7]

References

External links